Auriti is a surname. Notable people with the surname include:

Giacinto Auriti (1923–2006), Italian lawyer, essayist, and politician
Marino Auriti (1891–1980), Italian-born American artist